These are the results of the women's team all-around competition, one of six events for female competitors in artistic gymnastics at the 1980 Summer Olympics in Moscow.  The compulsory and optional rounds took place on July 21 and 23 at the Sports Palace of the Central Lenin Stadium.

Results
The final score for each team was determined by combining all of the scores earned by the team on each apparatus during the compulsory and optional rounds.  If all six gymnasts on a team performed a routine on a single apparatus during compulsories or optionals, only the five highest scores on that apparatus counted toward the team total.

References
Official Olympic Report
www.gymnasticsresults.com
www.gymn-forum.net

Women's team all-around
1980 in women's gymnastics
Women's events at the 1980 Summer Olympics